The Lake of Pânzelor (Romanian: Lacul Pânzelor, also called Lacul Inului) is a natural salt lake in the town of Ocna Sibiului, Sibiu County, Transylvania, Romania. It is one of the many lakes of the Ocna Sibiului mine, a large salt mine which has one of the largest salt reserves in Romania.

Name 
In Romanian, Lacul Pânzelor means The lake of webs. Its other name (Lacul Inului) means the lake of flax.

History 
The lake originates from the "Josef" salt mine, exploited with two wells and abandoned in 1770, due to strong infiltration of water through the walls.

Information 
Surface: 
Maximum depth: 
Salinity: 9 g/L at the surface, increases to 320 g/L at 5.5 m depth.

Lakes of the salt mine 
 Auster 
 Lake Avram Iancu-Ocniţa
 Balta cu Nămol 
 Brâncoveanu 
 Cloşca 
 Crişan
 Lacul Fără Fund 
 Gura Minei 
 Horea 
 Mâţelor 
 Negru
 Pânzelor 
 Rândunica 
 Verde (Freshwater lake)
 Vrăjitoarelor (Freshwater lake)

References

Lakes of Sibiu County